Shabakeh-ye Bon Dasht (also Romanized as Shabakeh-ye Bondasht and Shabakeh Bondasht; also known as Bondasht, Boneh Dasht, and Bundasht) is a village in Izadkhvast-e Sharqi Rural District, Izadkhvast District, Zarrin Dasht County, Fars Province, Iran. At the 2006 census, its population was 631, in 134 families.

References 

Populated places in Zarrin Dasht County